Anthony Francis Sharma S.J. (December 12, 1937 – December 8, 2015) was a Nepalese Jesuit prelate and educator who became the first Catholic bishop of Nepal. A member of the Society of Jesus, Sharma was appointed the prefect of Nepal in 1996 by Pope John Paul II. He was ordained Nepal's first Catholic bishop in 2007.

Sharma oversaw the growth of the modern Catholic Church in Nepal. He founded Caritas Nepal, a Catholic service organization, in 1990. He lobbied for official recognition of the Catholic faith by the government. In 1993, the Nepal Catholic Society won official recognition. Sharma also oversaw the establishment of 23 Catholic schools in the country.

Born in Gorkha, Nepal, Sharma was ordained a Catholic priest for the Society of Jesus in 1968. In 1984, Sharma was appointed superior and then prefect of Nepal in 1996. He was appointed titular bishop of Gigtha and vicar apostolic of Nepal in 2007.

References

External links

1937 births
2015 deaths
Jesuit bishops
Nepalese Jesuits
21st-century Roman Catholic bishops in Nepal
Nepalese people of Indian descent
People from Kathmandu
Nepalese Roman Catholic bishops